David G. Armstrong (born February 18, 1969) is an American podiatric surgeon and researcher most widely known for his work in amputation prevention, the diabetic foot, and wound healing. He and his frequent collaborators, Lawrence A. Lavery and Andrew J.M. Boulton, have together produced many key works in the taxonomy, classification and treatment of the diabetic foot. He is Professor of Surgery with Tenure and director of the Southwestern Academic Limb Salvage Alliance (SALSA) at the Keck School of Medicine of the University of Southern California and has produced more than 640 peer reviewed manuscripts and more than 100 book chapters.

Biography

Early years
Armstrong was raised with his younger brother, Darrin B. Armstrong, a schoolteacher, in Santa Maria, California. His father, Leo N. Armstrong, was a noted podiatrist in California and figures into many of Armstrong's anecdotes, lectures, and writings. As a child, he traveled worldwide with his family and a core group of physicians, mostly podiatrists. This influenced his later career as an ambassador for diabetic foot care and Podiatry.

After attending the Dunn School in Los Olivos, California, Armstrong attended Occidental College in Los Angeles and later the California College of Podiatric Medicine, where he graduated with honors. It was during his college years that he met his future wife, Tania C. Armstrong, on a family trip to Egypt. It is in honor of this that their first child Alexandria A. Armstrong, later received her name.

Armstrong performed his residency at the Kern Hospital for Special Surgery in Detroit, where much of his interest in the diabetic foot emerged. Additionally, it was where he became aware of the works of two influential clinician-researchers, Andrew JM Boulton, of the University of Manchester, and Paul Wilson Brand, of the Hansen's Disease Center in Carville, Louisiana.

The San Antonio years
Following his surgical training in Detroit, Armstrong was prepared to return to Santa Maria to work in his father's practice. Days before graduation, he was handed a letter inviting him to apply for a fellowship at the University of Texas Health Science Center at San Antonio. His visit and subsequent acceptance into the program brought him into close proximity of the next two important members of his development, Lawrence A. Lavery, then a junior faculty member, and Professor Lawrence B. Harkless, Armstrong's chief.

Armstrong's relationship with Lavery was, by all accounts, strong from the beginning. Lavery and Armstrong wrote an astonishing 28 manuscripts in the first nine months of his fellowship. Many of those became important foundational works in epidemiology, classification and treatment of the diabetic foot. Since that time, Armstrong and Lavery, nicknamed “the Lennon and McCartney of the Diabetic Foot”, have written more than 150 manuscripts, books and book chapters including the American Diabetes Associations Clinical Care of the Diabetic Foot. The two researchers credit Harkless for providing the environment for this to occur, as there had previously never existed a full-time academic podiatry faculty of this kind in an American medical school.

Following Lavery's departure to develop a private nationwide diabetic foot program, Armstrong remained prolific, but soon grew interested in new challenges.

Tucson: first tour
Armstrong subsequently received an invitation from Dr. Brent P. Nixon to start his own research service at the Southern Arizona VA Healthcare System in Tucson Arizona. This program, is responsible for producing many key works in the area of diabetes care and amputation prevention. Some of the most notable were the ability to accurately monitor activity and the refinement of offloading the diabetic foot wound. Additionally, Armstrong began a close transatlantic working relationship with Professor Andrew JM Boulton in Manchester. This mentorship led to a period of intense activity and a PhD and MD from the University of Manchester College of Medicine as well as a Master of Science in Tissue Repair of Wound Healing at Professor Keith Harding's University of Wales College of Medicine.

It was also during this time that Armstrong was reacquainted with George Andros, a prominent vascular surgeon. This renewed friendship led to the development of the Diabetic Foot Global Conference, (DFCon). This meeting, the largest annual diabetic foot gathering in the world, hosts delegates from 50 countries and all 50 U.S. states in more than 10 medical and surgical disciplines.

During his cross-country move from Tucson to Chicago, Armstrong's father and greatest influence died. This led to an increasing determination by Armstrong to further advance the specialty that had literally nurtured him.

Rosalind Franklin University, Scholl College and the "CLEAR years"
Following his tour in Tucson, Armstrong accepted an offer to serve as Professor of Surgery and Associate Dean at Scholl College of Podiatric Medicine at Rosalind Franklin University of Medicine and Science. He founded the Center for Lower Extremity Ambulatory Research (CLEAR), which rapidly became the most productive podiatric research group in the world. This program produced or recruited several key members of the field including Stephanie C. Wu, James Wrobel, Lee C. Rogers, Nicholas J. Bevilacqua, Bijan Najafi, Manish Bharara and Vickie Driver. This group produced many key works in the literature, becoming amongst the first podiatrists to be published in JAMA and the Lancet.  Armstrong also became the first tenured podiatrist in the history of Rosalind Franklin University and the Scholl College.

The University of Arizona
Armstrong, responding to his love of the Desert Southwest, the rampant diabetic epidemic there, and his long-standing friendship with renowned vascular surgeon Professor Joseph Mills, was recruited again to Tucson and the University of Arizona. It was there he founded, with Mills, the Southern Arizona Limb Salvage Alliance (SALSA). This program serves as a model for interdisciplinary care, worldwide. It was also here that Armstrong and Mills coined the term the “Toe and Flow” team. This implies the “irreducible minimum” requirements for a foot specialist and a vascular specialist in order to run a successful amputation prevention service. Working side by side in the same clinic and surgical service led to the development of the Society for Vascular Surgery's Wound, Ischemia and Foot Infection (WIfI) system, which has now been widely validated. This has helped many units develop a "common language" to describe the risk of limb threat.

As with Rosalind Franklin University, at the University of Arizona, he became the first ever podiatrist to be appointed as a tenured professor. It was also here that his interests in a merger between consumer electronics and health care began to flourish. He and Mills became the first surgeons to document a real-time surgical consultation via iPhone's FaceTime with their colleague (and Armstrong's former fellow), Lee C. Rogers. The SALSA vision for merging man and machine was further outlined in his UA College of Science Lecture "Repair, Regeneration and Replacement Revisited".

In 2012, Armstrong recruited Dr. Bijan Najafi from Rosalind Franklin University to help lead a mobile health program to, as he put it, "measure how we all move through and interact with our world". Dr. Najafi, previously at Rosalind Franklin University and Harvard, embarked on development of a broad-based program called the Interdisciplinary Consortium on Advanced Motion Performance (iCAMP). In 2017, Armstrong was honored as a University Distinguished Outreach Professor of Surgery- the first ever in the history of the University of Arizona's Department of Surgery.

University of Southern California- SALSA@USC and SALSA@Rancho
After the better part of a decade at the University of Arizona, Dr. Armstrong was recruited back to his home state of California to, in his words,  "help develop a program for amputation prevention spanning Southern California and beyond." The program, centered in the USC Department of Surgery but spanning a characteristically wide interdisciplinary remit, continued the well-known SALSA acronym, was now the Southwestern Academic Limb Salvage Alliance." The goal was to continue to drive care to better "measure and manage how people move through their world."

As part of this program, he has made efforts to develop interdisciplinary links between hospitals and clinics within the Los Angeles County Department of Health System. Most specifically, his efforts at the world-renowned National Rehabilitation Center at Rancho Los Amigos have led to the program having Diabetic Limb Preservation taken on as a focused area of clinical and research excellence.

The American Limb Preservation Society (ALPS)
In 2020, Armstrong and his frequent collaborators Joseph Mills (now of Baylor College of Medicine) and Michael Conte of UCSF worked to develop an interdisciplinary society with the goal of advancing science and clinical care in association with limb preservation and to develop the next generation of clinicians, scientists and clinician scientists in this field. This society took the "Alpine" acronym ALPS and symbolized the difficult task of interdisciplinary limb preservation. That task—compared by Armstrong and Mills with the Greek mythical figure Sisyphus—could be made easier if there were more than one person rolling a figurative boulder up a mountain. The American Limb Preservation Society was created on October 9, 2020 during the DFCon 2020 symposium—nicknamed DFCONline because of its peripandemic virtual format. The founding leadership team of ALPS included the aforementioned Armstrong, Mills and Conte along with Stephanie Wu, Dean of the Scholl College of Podiatric Medicine at Rosalind Franklin University as Vice President. Ryan Crews of Scholl and Brian Lepow of Baylor College of Medicine served as founding Secretary and Treasurer, respectively.

The Comparison of Diabetic Foot Complications to Another Chronic Disease-- Cancer-- and Movement Toward the Diabetic Foot in Remission
Armstrong has been widely credited with popularizing the comparison of the diabetic foot to cancer. In collecting data from mortality, cost, and recurrence. Specifically, regarding remission, Armstrong and colleagues have made the case that the goal should not be to eliminate every single event, but rather to make each event as uncomplicated as possible. This popularized the idea of diabetic foot "ulcer-free days" "hospital-free days" and "activity-rich days". This also paved the way for remote patient monitoring (RPM) to become more popular in care in this and other areas.

Recognition of the disease and of the investigator
During the course of his career, Armstrong has been acknowledged with awards by numerous organizations. In response to his hundreds of lectures in more than 40 nations, worldwide, Armstrong was selected as one of the first six International Wound Care Ambassadors. He was honored with the inaugural Georgetown Distinguished Award for Diabetic Limb Salvage. In 2010, he was the youngest ever recipient of the Roger Pecoraro Award and Lectureship from the American Diabetes Association, widely viewed as a lifetime achievement award in the field of the diabetic foot. That same year, he was also named the 2010 Honorary Fellow of the American College of Certified Wound Specialists as well as the inaugural recipient of the William S. Baer Award for Advances in Biosurgery/Biotherapy by the International Conference on Biotherapy. He was the first podiatric surgeon to become a member of the Society for Vascular Surgery and the first American podiatric surgeon to be named fellow of the Royal College of Physicians and Surgeons, Glasgow. He frequently offers that these awards are more "recognitions of the importance of the problem" and of "the acknowledgement of the occupation in the care of people at risk."
Armstrong is past Chair of Scientific Sessions for the ADA's Foot Care Council, and a past member of the National Board of Directors of the American Diabetes Association. He sits on the Infectious Diseases Society of America’s Diabetic Foot Infection Advisory Committee. In 2011, he was appointed Chair of the World Diabetic Foot Commission of the FIP, representing clinicians from more than 30 nations. Dr. Armstrong has also been conferred the title of Visiting Professor at the University of Manchester College of Medicine, the University of Cardiff College of Medicine, the Raine Visiting Professor] at University of Western Australia, University of Cincinnati during its 200th anniversary and the Complutense University of Madrid.

In 2006, Armstrong was awarded the Father of the Year Award by the National Father's Day Council and the Chicago Area American Diabetes Association. He lives in Los Angeles with his wife Tania and three daughters Alexandria, Natalie and Nina.

References

External links
 DiabeticFootOnline.com
 DFCon
 SALSA Blog

American surgeons
University of Arizona alumni
1969 births
Living people
People from Santa Maria, California
Rosalind Franklin University of Medicine and Science faculty
Occidental College alumni